Troy Brenna (born May 8, 1970) is an American stunt actor, motion capture actor, stunt coordinator, and actor. He was born in Oconomowoc, Wisconsin. He has one younger brother and two older sisters. He has performed stunts for films such as X-Men, Thor, and Fast Five. He has acted in roles including Takers, Spy Next Door and television spots such as Arrested Development. He has also performed motion capture in films such as The Avengers.

Filmography

Films
 Penance Lane (2014) - Stuntman/Duke
 Halo 4 (2012) - Motion Capture Performer
 R.I.P.D. (2013) - Motion Capture Performer
 The Avengers (2012) - Stunt Actor/Motion Capture Performer
 Thor (2011) - Stunts/Frost Giant
 Fast Five (2011) - Stunts/Brazilian Thug
 Xander Cohen (2012) - Stunt Coordinator/Big Ben
 Blood Shot (2011) - Stunts/Genie
 Cowboys & Aliens (2011) -Stunt Actor/Motion Capture Performer
 Priest (2011) - Stunts
 Takers (2010) - Stuntman/Sweatpants
 The Spy Next Door (2010) - Stuntman/Russian Thug
 Sherlock Holmes - Robert Maillet Stunt Double (Uncredited)
 Avatar (2009) - Stunt Actor/Motion Capture Performer
 Cirque du Freak: The Vampire's Assistant (2009) - Stuntman/Vampanese
 Road to Moloch (2009) - Stunts
 Fast & Furious (2009) - Stunts
 Star Trek (2009) - Stuntman/Klingon
 Blood and Bone (2009) - Stuntman/Viktor
 The Seed - Stunts
 Judgement Date (2009) - Stunt Coordinator/Bouncer
 Get Smart (2008) - Stunts (Uncredited)
 The God Project (2008) - Stunt Coordinator/Assaulter
 The Rundown (2003) - Stunts
 Bobby Z (2007) - Stunts/Prison Guard
 The Marine (2006) - Stunts
 Ultraviolet (2006) - Stunts
 Today You Die (2005) - Stuntman/Body Guard
 The Amateurs (2005) - Stuntman/Earnest Pike
 El Padrino (2004) - Rolph Mueller Stunt Double
 Hulk (2003) - Eric Bana Stunt Double
 Cradle 2 the Grave (2003) - Stuntman/Cage Fighter
 The Scorpion King (2002) - Tyler Mane/King Stunt Double
 3000 Miles to Graceland (2001) - Stunts
 X-Men (2000) - Tyler Mane/Sabertooth Stunt Double
 The Postman (1997) - Abraham Benrubi Stunt Double
 Volcano (1997) - Stunts
 The Pest (1997) - Stunts

Television
Supah Ninjas (2012) - Stuntman/Big Show Stunt Double
 Wizards of Waverly Place (2011) - Stuntman/Washong
 I'm in the Band (2011) - Stuntman/Mega Burger
 My Name is Earl (2009) - Stuntman/Jack/Matt Willig Stunt Double
 NCIS (TV series) (2008) - Stuntman/Kidnapper
 Chuck (TV series) (2007) - Stuntman/Thug
 Bones (TV series) (2006) - Stuntman/Monroe
 Dollhouse (TV series) - Stunts
 CSI: NY - Stunts
 The Bachelor - Stunts
 Scrubs (TV series) (2007) - Stuntman/College Footballer
 Inside the Action - Stunt Driving
 Inside the Action 2 - Stunts
 Fallen (TV miniseries) - Stunts
 Cane (TV series) (2007) - Howard Stunt Double
 Alias (TV series) (2006) - Stuntman/Russian Thug
 American Dreams (2002) - Stunt Coordinator
 Arrested Development (TV series) (2005) - Stuntman/Dragon
 Wanted (2005 TV series) (2005) - Stuntman/Bouncer
 Star Trek: Enterprise (2001) - Stuntman/Klingon
 10-8: Officers on Duty (2003) - Stuntman/Bunny
 Buffy the Vampire Slayer (TV series) (2002) - Stuntman/Avilas Demon/Vampire/Nesla Demon
 Angel (1999 TV series) (2002) - Stuntman/Prison Guest/Nesla Demon
 V.I.P. (American TV series) (2001) - Stuntman/Steroidal
 Martial Law (TV series) (1999) - Stuntman/Union Worker
 Married... with Children (1997) - Stuntman/Chicago Bear Center
 Rose Red (miniseries) (2002) - Stunts

References

External links

Troy Brenna mini Bio

1970 births
Living people
American stunt performers